Bidhuri is a surname found in India and associated with the people of Gujjar caste. Vidhudi/Vidhuri/Bhiduri/Bidhudi is an alternative English surname spelling.

Famous personalities with Bidhuri surname :

 Rajesh Pilot, Rajeshwar Prasad Bidhuri (born 1945), Indian Politician, Minister in the Government of India, and Former Indian Air Force, Officer.

 Sachin Pilot (born 1977) Born as Sachin Bidhuri, Indian Politician, MLA from Tonk (Rajasthan) Former Deputy Chief Minister of Rajasthan, Former Member of Parliament from Dausa (2009) and Ajmer (2014). Son of Rajesh Pilot.

 Ramesh Bidhuri, (born 1961), Indian politician, two times Member of Parliament from South Delhi (2014, 2019) and three times MLA from Tughlaqabad assembly (2003, 2008, 2013).
 Ramvir Singh Bidhuri, (born 1952), Indian politician, Leader of Opposition Delhi Assembly and four times MLA from Badarpur (Delhi) (1993, 2003, 2013, 2020).
 Sahi Ram, (born 1959), Indian politician, two times MLA from Tughlaqabad (Delhi) (2015 & 2020).
 Rajendra Singh Bidhuri, (born 1961), Indian politician, two times MLA from Begun (Rajasthan) (2008 & 2018), belongs to Village Tughlaqabad, New Delhi. https://rajendrasinghbidhuri.com/
 Gaurav Bidhuri (born 1993), Indian athlete (Boxing). Belongs to Madanpur Khadar Village of South Delhi.
 Kunwar Bidhuri, Ranji player for Delhi.
 Vijay Kumar Bidhuri is an Indian Administrative Service IAS officer, currently he is serving as Divisional Commissioner in Kashmir.

==References==

Indian surnames